Gabriela Kimberly García León (born 19 October 1993) is a female racewalker from Peru. She won gold medals in the women's 20 kilometres walk and 35 km walk at the 2022 World Athletics Championships, becoming the first Peruvian medallist in championships history and the first Latin American to earn two titles at the same World Athletics Championships.

García represented Peru in the women's 20 kilometres walk at the 2016 Rio Olympics and 2020 Tokyo Olympics. She holds South American record in the 35 km walk and three Peruvian national records (10,000 m walk, 10 km walk and 20 km walk).

Early life
Kimberly García comes from the Inca nation and was born in Huancayo in central Peru. Her family has always been linked to race walking, so she started training when she was 5 years old, following in the footsteps of her cousin.

Career
As a 12-year-old García won the 5 kilometres race walk at the Peruvian Race Walking Under-18 Championships and Peruvian U18 Championships. Three years later, in 2009, she took victory in the 10 km walk U20 event of the Peruvian Race Walking Championships. She was seventh at the 2010 Youth Olympic Games held in Singapore (5000 m walk).

At 19, she claimed the gold medal in the 20 km walk at the 2013 Pan American Race Walking Cup. García won also the event at the 2014 South American Race Walking Championships. In May that year, she set her first South American record (20 km) in Taicang, China. García placed 14th in the event at the 2016 Rio Olympics. After the Games, she considered retiring from professional athletics due to the lack of support from private companies.

In 2017, she achieved the highest position of Peruvian athlete in a World Athletics Championships, finishing seventh in the 20 km walk at the Championships in London.

In 2019, García won the silver medal in the event at the Pan American Games staged in Lima. In December that year, she was named Athlete of the Year by the Peruvian Athletics Sport Federation.

She qualified for the event but failed to finish the 20 km walk at the postponed 2020 Tokyo Olympics.

2022
In March, the 28-year-old finished third in the 20 km walk at the World Race Walking Team Championships held in Muscat, Oman. In April, she broke the South American record in the 35 km walk at the Dudinská Päťdesiatka meeting in Dudince, Slovakia.

At the World Athletics Championships held in Eugene, Oregon in July, García first won 20 km walk in a national record, becoming the first ever medallist from Peru in championships history and ending longer than 10 years Chinese dominance in the event. Seven days later, she added second title for the 35 km walk, improving her own South American record and becoming the first woman to earn two racewalking titles at one global championships. García also became the first Latin American to win two gold medals at the same World Athletics Championships. In November, she was shortlisted for the World Athletics Female Athlete of the Year award.

Achievements

Personal bests
 10,000 metres race walk – 42:56.97 (Trujillo] 2018) 
 10 kilometres race walk – 43:23 (Suzhou] 2017) 
 20 kilometres race walk – 1:26:58 (Eugene, OR 2022) 
 35 kilometres race walk – 2:39:16 (Eugene, OR 2022) South American record

International competitions

See also
 Peru at the 2015 World Championships in Athletics
 Peru at the 2022 World Athletics Championships

References

External links

1993 births
Living people
Place of birth missing (living people)
Peruvian female racewalkers
Peruvian female athletes
World Athletics Championships athletes for Peru
Athletes (track and field) at the 2010 Summer Youth Olympics
Athletes (track and field) at the 2015 Pan American Games
Athletes (track and field) at the 2019 Pan American Games
Athletes (track and field) at the 2016 Summer Olympics
Olympic athletes of Peru
Athletes (track and field) at the 2018 South American Games
South American Games gold medalists for Peru
South American Games medalists in athletics
Pan American Games medalists in athletics (track and field)
Pan American Games silver medalists for Peru
Medalists at the 2019 Pan American Games
South American Games gold medalists in athletics
Athletes (track and field) at the 2020 Summer Olympics
21st-century Peruvian women